Antonio Cieri (Vasto, November 11, 1898 – Huesca, April 7, 1937) was an Italian anarchist and anti-fascist militant, member of the Arditi del Popolo who fought and died during the Spanish Civil War.

Biography 
During the World war I, he received the Bronze Medal of Military Valor for his role in keeping alive the army telecommunications.

He was an activist of the anarchist movement of Ancona, where he was employed by the State Railways as a technical designer. In 1921, he was transferred to Parma due to his political activity. There, during the Parma Barricades, in August 1922 together with Guido Picelli, who directed the entire anti-fascist formation, he was commander of the Arditi del Popolo in the defense of the Naviglio, a popular district of Parma, against the assaults of Italo Balbo's fascist squads.

In 1923, he was fired from the State Railways and went into exile. In Paris, he resumed his activity as a militant anarchist by publishing the periodical Umanità Nova. In 1936, he left to participate in the Italian Section of the Ascaso Column for the Republican side in the Spanish Civil War. On April 7, 1937, he died during an assault against the Nationalist-held Huesca. There were suspicions that during the battle he was killed from the back by Stalinists of the Republican faction, and not by the "official" enemies.

Commemoration 
Parma dedicated a square to him in 1984. A plaque in Piazza Rossetti in Vasto has been raised for him.

References 

Italian anti-fascists
1937 deaths
1898 births
20th-century Italian people
Italian anarchists